The Provisional National Defence Council  (PNDC) was the name of the Ghanaian government after the People's National Party's elected government was overthrown by Jerry Rawlings, the former head of the Armed Forces Revolutionary Council, in a coup d'état on 31 December 1981. He remained in power until 7 January 1993. In a statement, Rawlings said that a "holy war" was necessary due to the PNP's failure to provide effective leadership and the collapse of the national economy and state services. 

The PNDC was a military dictatorship that induced civilians to participate in governance. Most of its members were civilians. Its policies reflected a revolutionary government that was pragmatic in its approach. The economic objectives of the PNDC were to halt Ghana's economic decay, stabilize the economy, and stimulate economic growth. The PNDC also brought a change in the people’s attitude from a 'government will provide' position to participating in nation-building.

The PNDC provided a new constitution in 1992 and held elections that year. Rawlings's party, the NDC, won the presidential election with 58% of the vote. The opposition boycotted the subsequent parliamentary elections.

Members 
The seven original members of the PNDC from its inception were as follows:
 Flt. Lt. Jerry John Rawlings - Chairman
 Brigadier Joseph Nunoo-Mensah - retired Chief of Defence Staff
 Reverend Dr. Vincent Kwabena Damuah
 Warrant Officer I Joseph Adjei Buadi
 Sergeant Daniel Alolga Akata Pore
 Joachim Amartey Quaye
 Chris Bukari Atim

Brigadier Nunoo-Mensah, who had been retired by the Limann government, was recalled as Chief of Defence Staff and the second-in-command of the PNDC. Reverend Damuah was an outspoken priest of the Roman Catholic Church in Ghana. Joachim Amartey Quaye was a labour leader who led a strike at the Ghana Industrial Holding Corporation (GIHOC) and was removed by Hilla Limann's government. Chris Bukari Atim was a student leader and friend of Jerry Rawlings. Adjei Buadi and Akata Pore were junior ranks in the Ghana Air Force.

Departures and replacements
Over the years, some people were added to the membership and others left. A number left in 1982 due to ideological differences. Joachim Amartey Quaye was executed for his involvement in the murder of three senior judges and a retired army officer. Rev. Damuah who was suspended from the Catholic Church because of his involvement in the government left in late 1982 and started his own church later called the Afrikania Mission, an organization devoted to the promotion of African Traditional Religion.

Additions
 Mrs. Aanaa Naamua Enin- appointed August 1982
 Ebo Tawiah - appointed August 1982
 Naa Polku Konkuu Chiiri - appointed January 1983
 Justice D.F. Annan- appointed 1984
 Alhaji Mahama Iddrisu - appointed October 1984
 Captain (rtd) Kojo Tsikata - July 1985
 P. V. Obeng - July 1985
 Major General Arnold Quainoo
 Maj. Gen. Winston C.M. Mensa-Wood
 Captain (rtd) Kingsley Bruce
 Air Vice Marshal A. H. K. Dumashie
 Dr. Mrs. Mary Grant - appointed 1989
 Mrs. Susanna Al-Hassan - appointed 1985

Departures
 Brigadier Joseph Nunoo Mensah - resigned 1982
 Rev. Dr. Kwabena Damuah - resigned 1982
 Warrant Officer I Mumuni Seidu- resigned June 1994
 Warrant Officer I Joseph Adjei Buadi - resigned December 1984
 Sergeant Daniel Alolga Akata Pore - 1982
 Joachim Amartey Quaye - executed August 1982
 Chris Bukari Atim - resigned 1982
 Ebo Tawiah
 Naa Polku Konkuu Chiiri - died 25 August 1984 
 Brigadier W. M. Mensa-Wood
 Captain Kingsley Bruce
 Mrs. Susanna Al-Hassan - departed 1987
 Mrs. Aanaa Naamua Enin - left in 1989

August 1992 onwards — final membership
 Flt. Lt. Jerry John Rawlings - Chairman
 Justice D. F. Annan
 Alhaji Mahama Iddrisu
 Captain (rtd) Kojo Tsikata
 P. V. Obeng
 Lieutenant General Arnold Quainoo
 Air Vice Marshal  Dumashie
 Dr. Mrs. Mary Grant

Membership

Secretaries 
The officials in charge of the various ministries were designated as Secretaries of state.

References 

Military of Ghana
Military coups in Ghana
Governments of Ghana
Politics of Ghana
1993 in Ghana
1981 establishments in Ghana
1993 disestablishments
1980s coups d'état and coup attempts
Military dictatorships